Events in the year 1135 in Norway.

Incumbents
Monarchs - Magnus IV Sigurdsson and Harald Gille

Events

7 January – In a naval battle in Bergen, Harald Gille defeated King Magnus. Magnus was captured and dethroned, blinded, castrated and had one leg cut off, and was subsequently placed in the Nidarholm Abbey.
18 January - Bishop Reinald of Stavanger was executed by hanging in Bergen.

Arts and literature

Births

Deaths
18 January – Reinald, the first Bishop of the Ancient Diocese of Stavanger, executed by hanging.

References

Norway